İsmail Hakkı may refer to:

Bursalı İsmail Hakkı or İsmail Hakkı Bursevî (1653-1725), Ottoman lyricist, Sufi sheikh of the Jelveti Tekke in Bursa. Penned countless works on Tasavvuf, Islamic philosophy, morality and Tefsir.
İsmail Hakkı Bey (1883-1923), officer of the Ottoman Army and the Turkish Army
İsmail Hakkı Duru (born 1946), Turkish theoretical physicist and professor of Mathematics
İsmail Hakkı Karadayı (born 1932), Turkish general